Fonscochlea accepta is a species of minute freshwater snails with an operculum, aquatic gastropod molluscs or micromolluscs in the family Hydrobiidae. This species is endemic to Australia.

References

Gastropods of Australia
Fonscochlea
Vulnerable fauna of Australia
Gastropods described in 1989
Taxonomy articles created by Polbot